Paul Johnston may refer to:

Paul Johnston (cricketer) (born 1988), English cricketer
Nick Johnston (politician) (Paul Nicholas Johnston, born 1948), Scottish politician
Paul Johnston (printer) (1899–1987), fine press printer and book designer
Paul Johnston (diplomat) (born 1968), British ambassador to Ireland and Sweden

See also
Paul Johnstone (disambiguation)
Paul Johnson (disambiguation)